Jan Koetsier (14 August 1911 in Amsterdam – 28 April 2006 in Munich) was a Dutch composer and conductor.

In 1950, Koetsier became the first  of the Bavarian Radio Symphony Orchestra. As a composer, he wrote chamber music, and orchestral and choral works, as well as the opera .

A well-known example of his composition is Brass Symphony from 1979, which is divided into three movements and arranged for a brass dectet.

In 1992, the Jan Koetsier Foundation was established by an endowment from the composer.  One of the main responsibilities of the Foundation, which has been based at the  since 2001, is the organization of the biennial International Jan Koetsier Competition.

Selected works
Variation uber ein Kinderliend for orchestra (1932, revised 1967)
Serenata serena for string orchestra, Op. 11 (1936, revised 1953)
Concertino for viola and orchestra, Op. 21 (1940, revised 1955)
Symphony No. 2 for choir and orchestra (1947)
Partita for cor anglais and organ (1956)
Partita  for trombone and organ, Op. 41, No. 3 (1976)
Cinq Impromptus for trombone quartet, Op. 55 (1970)
Sonatina trombone and piano, Op. 58, No. 1 (1970)
Allegro maestoso for bass trombone and piano, Op. 58, No. 2 (1972)
 for brass ensemble, Op. 67b (1978)
Duo Giocoso for trumpet (or oboe) and viola, Op. 69 (1979)
Concertino for tuba and orchestra, Op. 77 (1978/rev. 1982)
Introduction and Variations on a Theme from the Opera "" by Werner Egk for viola and piano, Op. 82, No. 3 (1978)
Concertino Drammatico for violin, viola and string orchestra, Op. 88 (1981)
Ballade for cor anglais and piano, Op. 90 (1981)
Concertino for trombone and string orchestra, Op. 91 (1982)
II. Duo Concertante for cello, bassoon and orchestra, Op. 92 (1983)
 for two flutes and string orchestra, Op. 98
 for carillon, Op. 99
 for trombone quartet, Op. 105/3b (1986)
Concertino for trombone quartet and string orchestra, Op. 115 (1988)
 variations for trombone and piano, Op. 116 (1989)
 for trombone quartet and speaker/narrator, Op. 127 (1991)
 for solo bass trombones and 3 tenor trombones, Op. 134 (1993)
 for tuba quartet, Op. 136 (1993)
 for trombone quartet, Op. 138 (1994)

Discography
II. Duo Concertante for Violoncello, Bassoon and Orchestra, Op. 92. MiX-5: Premiere Recordings for Bassoon and Cello. Lynne Feller-Marshall, bassoon; John Marshall, cello. 2011. CD. With music by Martin Zalba Ibanez, Mike Curtis, Guang Yu Liu, Paul Desmond, Max Stern, Arthur Frackenpohl, Paul Hindemith, Béla Bartók, and Jimi Hendrix.
, op. 98 for two flutes and string orchestra. World premiere. Flutes: Andras Adorjan, Marianne Henkel, 'Franz Liszt' chamber orchestra, János Rolla. CD with music by C.P.E Bach, Ignaz Pleyel.

References

External links
Jan Koetsier Foundation (Hochschule für Musik und Theater München)
Obituary in Neue Musikzeitung (in German)

1911 births
2006 deaths
20th-century classical composers
20th-century conductors (music)
20th-century Dutch male musicians
Composers for carillon
Dutch classical composers
Dutch conductors (music)
Dutch male classical composers
Male conductors (music)
Musicians from Amsterdam
Academic staff of the University of Music and Performing Arts Munich